Solaiyamma is a 1992 Indian Tamil-language film directed by Kasthuri Raja. The film stars Rahul, Sukanya and Karikalan. It was released on 11 December 1992.

Plot 

Solaiyamma is a mother-less woman who is looked after by her father. She has been promised in marriage with her relative Balraj and they are in love. Vairavan is a heartless muscular man who spreads terror among the villagers and rapes the village girls. One night, Vairavan enters Solaiyamma's house and tries to rape Solaiyamma but she stands against him and Vairavan runs away. The entire village thinks that she has been raped including her relatives and then her father commits suicide. Thereafter, she is rejected by the village. Vairavan tortures her psychologically to spend a night with him. What transpires later forms the crux of the story.

Cast 

Rahul as Balraj
Sukanya as Solaiyamma
Karikalan as Vairavan
Janagaraj as Balraj's father
Senthil as Minor
Vinu Chakravarthy
Jai Ganesh
Ganthimathi as Irulayi, Balraj's mother
Ragavi
Nisha
Sathyan
Salem Mathi
G. Ramachandran (producer) as Paramasivan Periyavan
Gundu Kalyanam
Periya Karuppu Thevar
Karuppu Subbiah as Marimuthu
T. K. S. Karuppaiah
Pakoda Kadhar
Idichapuli Selvaraj

Soundtrack 
The music was composed by Deva, with lyrics written by Kasthuri Raja.

Reception 
K. Vijayan of New Straits Times praised the film's message while Malini Mannath of The Indian Express described the film as "painful viewing". C. R. K. of Kalki also gave a similar negative review for the film citing this one is neither smell of soil nor smell of sore, its a stench.

References

External links 
 

1990s Tamil-language films
1992 films
Films directed by Kasthuri Raja
Films scored by Deva (composer)